Dumatubun Airport is an airport in Langgur, Kai Islands, in the Maluku province of Indonesia. The airport was closed  on 19 December 2014 as all flights were moved to the new Karel Sadsuitubun Airport.

References

External links
 
 

Airports in Maluku
Indonesian Air Force bases